The Youngstown Sheet and Tube Company, based in Youngstown, Ohio, was an American steel manufacturer. Officially, the company was created on November 23, 1900, when Articles of Incorporation of the Youngstown Iron Sheet and Tube Company were filed with the Ohio Secretary of State at Columbus. In 1905 the word "Iron" was dropped from the company name to reflect the company's shift in focus from producing wrought iron products to basic steel products. It acquired the Mark Manufacturing Company in 1923. Youngstown Sheet and Tube remained in business until 1977. A Youngstown resident  acquired the name, trademark, and logo in 2014 and opened a small business promoting the economic redevelopment of Youngstown.

History
In 1888, Youngstown industrialists George D. Wick and James A. Campbell organized the Mahoning Valley Iron Company, with Wick as president. Charles Dayton Arms, Wicks brother in law and also an iron entrepreneur, was brought in as president. Five years later, the two men resigned from the firm when it was taken over by the Republic Iron and Steel Company, and their next project would come in response to major changes that occurred in the community's industrial sector. Youngstown's industrial leaders began to convert from iron to steel manufacturing at the turn of the century, a period that also saw a wave of consolidations that placed much of the community's industry in the hands of national corporations. To the rising concern of many area industrialists, U.S. Steel, shortly after its establishment in 1901, absorbed Youngstown's premier steel producer, the National Steel Corporation.

During the previous year, however, Wick and Campbell combined resources with other local investors who wanted to maintain significant levels of local ownership within the city's manufacturing sector. The group established the Youngstown Iron Sheet and Tube Company with $600,000 in capital. Wick, who emerged as the steel company's first president in 1900, appointed Campbell as secretary. The word "Iron" was dropped from the company's name in 1905. Although the company's focus began with sheet and tube, it eventually became one of the nation's most important steel producers with a varied product line.

In 1923, Youngstown Sheet and Tube purchased the assets of the Brier Hill Steel Company (also located in Youngstown, at Brier Hill), as well as the facilities of the Steel and Tube Company of America in East Chicago and Indiana Harbor, Indiana, making it the fifth largest steel maker in the United States and the largest employer in the Mahoning Valley.

The home plant of YS&T was known as the Campbell Works, located in Campbell and Struthers, Ohio. The Brier Hill Works consisted of two blast furnaces named Grace and Jeannette, twelve open hearth furnaces, a  blooming mill, a  intermediate blooming mill, a  round mill,  and  plate mills, and an electric-weld tube mill. During much of the Depression, the Brier Hill works was shut down, but it reopened in 1937. Much of the reopened plant's production comprised tube rounds for the Campbell seamless tube mills. Due to the imbalance of ironmaking and steelmaking facilities at the two plants, rail shipments of molten iron "hot metal" were sent from Campbell to Brier Hill from 1937 until 1979.

In 1916, Sheet and Tube workers at the East Youngstown plant rioted during a strike over working conditions, which resulted in most of the town's business district being burned to the ground. The strike was quelled by the arrival of National Guard troops. After the riots, East Youngstown was renamed Campbell in honor of the company's president. In 1937, Youngstown Sheet and Tube played a prominent role in the Little Steel Strike, along with Republic Steel, Inland Steel, Bethlehem Steel, and Weirton Steel. The so-called "Little Steel" group, led by Republic's Tom Girdler, operated independently of United States Steel, which had previously signed a labor agreement with the Congress of Industrial Organizations (CIO) and its subordinate Steel Workers Organizing Committee (SWOC). Violence during this strike resulted in the deaths of workers in Chicago and Youngstown.

In 1952, during the Korean War, President Harry S. Truman attempted to seize American steel mills in order to avert a strike. This led to the U.S. Supreme Court decision of Youngstown Sheet & Tube Company v. Sawyer, which limited presidential authority.

The company abruptly closed its Campbell Works and furloughed 5,000 workers on September 19, 1977, a day remembered locally as "Black Monday." The Brier Hill Works and the company's plants in Indiana were sold to Jones and Laughlin Steel, later acquired by Ling-Temco-Vought (LTV), a conglomerate.  The Brier Hill Works closed in 1979 as part of a continued wave of steel mill closings that devastated the Youngstown economy.  The Brier Hill Works was eventually reopened in 1986 by Cargill Corporation, under the name North Star Steel.  In 2002, Cargill sold the operations to recycling minimill Vallourec Group, a French conglomerate. The Indiana Harbor mill continues operating, owned by Cleveland-Cliffs.

Present day
The company currently operates under the Youngstown Sheet and Tube name at www.sheetandtube.com. The company promotes economic redevelopment in Youngstown, and has partnerships with local manufacturers. It currently has an online shop where people can purchase apparel and consumer goods, and has a long term plan of opening up its own factory in the Youngstown area.

Notable employees
 Joseph G. Butler, Jr., American industrialist and philanthropist, founder of the Butler Institute of American Art. 
 James A. Campbell, first Secretary of the Board, 1900, appointed Company president 1904, President of American Iron and Steel Institute during World War I.
 Pete Mauthe, WWII-era president, elected to College Football Hall of Fame.
 Ernest L. Webster, Los Angeles, California, City Council member, 1927–31.

See also
 Burnet v. Logan
 Steel Valley (Ohio-Pennsylvania)

Notes

References 
 Blue, Frederick J.; Jenkins, William D.; Lawson, William H.; Reedy, Joan M. (1995). Mahoning Memories: A History of Youngstown and Mahoning County. Virginia Beach, VA: The Donning Company. .
 Ruminski,  Clayton J. Iron Valley: The Transformation of the Iron Industry in Ohio’s Mahoning Valley, 1802—1913 (Ohio State University Press, 2017).

External links
Youngstown Sheet and Tube versus Sawyer
Youngstown Sheet and Tube Company. Steel Seizure Case. Records, 1952. 5365. Kheel Center for Labor-Management Documentation and Archives, Martin P. Catherwood Library, Cornell University.
The Youngstown Sheet and Tube Company

Steel companies of the United States
Companies based in Youngstown, Ohio
Manufacturing companies based in Ohio
Defunct companies based in Ohio
Manufacturing companies established in 1900
Manufacturing companies disestablished in 1977
1900 establishments in Ohio
1977 disestablishments in Ohio
American companies disestablished in 1977